Edgebrook, New Jersey may refer to:

Edgebrook, Mercer County, New Jersey 
Edgebrook, Middlesex County, New Jersey